Lists of Argentine provincial governors cover governors of the provinces of Argentina, including current governors, female governors, and governors of each province.

General
 List of current provincial governors in Argentina
 List of female provincial governors in Argentina

By province

 Governor of the Buenos Aires Province
 Governor of Chaco Province
 Governor of Chubut province
 Governor of Corrientes Province
 Governor of Entre Ríos Province
 Governor of Formosa Province
 Governor of Jujuy Province
 Governor of La Pampa Province
 Governor of Misiones Province
 Governor of Neuquén Province
 Governor of Río Negro Province
 Governor of Salta Province
 Governor of San Juan Province
 List of Governors of Santa Cruz
 Governor of Santa Fe Province
 Governor of Santiago del Estero
 List of Governors of Tierra del Fuego